Trudy Lee Anderson (born 26 August 1959) is a New Zealand former cricketer who played as a right-handed batter. She appeared in 2 Test matches and 26 One Day Internationals for New Zealand between 1993 and 1997. She played domestic cricket for Auckland, Central Districts and Canterbury.

References

External links

1959 births
Living people
Cricketers from Dunedin
New Zealand women cricketers
New Zealand women Test cricketers
New Zealand women One Day International cricketers
Auckland Hearts cricketers
Central Districts Hinds cricketers
Canterbury Magicians cricketers